John Tufts may refer to:

John Q. Tufts (1840–1908), American politician
John Tufts (music educator) (1689–1750)